Yeh Raat Phir Na Aaygi is a 1966 Bollywood film starring Prithviraj Kapoor, Biswajeet, Sharmila Tagore, Mumtaz and Sailesh Kumar in key roles. Mumtaz and Sailesh Kumar played negative roles in this movie.

Plot
Ye Raat Phir Na Aayegi is a rivetting film about a woman's two thousand year old skeleton mysteriously coming to life as Kiran, after it was excavated by Reeta and her assistant Rakesh from a site of archaeological interest. Amid the passage of these surreal events, Reeta and her widower father come to know that Kiran has resurfaced after two thousand years to claim Suraj, her lover from the past life, who is presently engaged to Reeta as her fiancé.

Cast
Prithviraj Kapoor as Professor
Biswajeet as Suraj
Sharmila Tagore as Kiran
Mumtaz as Rita
Helen as Special Appearance in song Huzoorewala, Jo Ho Ijazat, To Hum Yeh Sare Jahan Se Kehde
Suresh as Special Appearance in song Huzoorewala, Jo Ho Ijazat, To Hum Yeh Sare Jahan Se Kehde
Madhumati as Special Appearance in song Huzoorewala, Jo Ho Ijazat, To Hum Yeh Sare Jahan Se Kehde
Sailesh Kumar as Rakesh
 Harbans Darshan M Arora as Doctor
 Asit Sen (actor) as Gangaram
 B. M. Vyas as Kiran's father
 M.A. Latif as visiting delegate to ruins
 Sopariwala as foreign reporter visiting ruins

Soundtrack

References

External links
 

1966 films
1960s Hindi-language films
Films scored by O. P. Nayyar
Films directed by Brij Sadanah